The Cartier Horse of the Year is an award in European horse racing, founded in 1991, and sponsored by Cartier SA as part of the Cartier Racing Awards. The award winner is decided by points earned in group races plus the votes cast by British racing journalists and readers of the Racing Post and The Daily Telegraph newspapers.

Records
Most successful horse (2 wins):
 Ouija Board – 2004, 2006
 Frankel – 2011, 2012
 Enable – 2017, 2019

Leading trainer (5 wins):
 John Gosden – Kingman (2014), Golden Horn (2015), Enable (2017, 2019), Roaring Lion (2018)
 Aidan O'Brien – Giant's Causeway (2000), Rock of Gibraltar (2002), Dylan Thomas (2007), Minding (2016), St Mark's Basilica (2021)

Leading owner (5 wins):

 Khalid Abdullah – Frankel (2011, 2012), Kingman (2014), Enable (2017, 2019)
 Sue Magnier – Giant's Causeway (2000), Rock of Gibraltar (2002), Dylan Thomas (2007), Minding (2016), St Mark's Basilica (2021)

Winners

References

Horse racing awards